Daane is a surname. Notable people with the surname include:

J. Dewey Daane (1918–2017), American economist
Peter Daane (1835–1914), American businessman and politician

See also
Dane (name)